Comet Urata-Niijima is a periodic comet in the Solar System discovered by Japanese astronomers Tsuneo Niijima and Takeshi Urata on October 30, 1986, at Ojima, the first orbit was calculated by Brian G. Marsden on November 5 giving an orbital period of 6.42 years.

On October 20, 1993, the comet was recovered by J. V. Scotti (Spacewatch, Kitt Peak Observatory, Arizona, United States), and on the next return on March 4, 2000, by Philippe. L. Lamy and Harold. A. Weaver using the Hubble Space Telescope.

References

External links 
 Orbital simulation from JPL (Java) / Horizons Ephemeris
 112P at Kronk's Cometography
 112P at Kazuo Kinoshita's Comets
 112P at Seiichi Yoshida's Comet Catalog

Periodic comets
0112
Comets in 2013
19861030